Biały Bór may refer to the following places:
Biały Bór, Kuyavian-Pomeranian Voivodeship (north-central Poland)
Biały Bór, Subcarpathian Voivodeship (south-east Poland)
Biały Bór in West Pomeranian Voivodeship (north-west Poland)